"Kizuna" is the eighth extended play from Orange Range. It was used in the drama Ima, Ai ni Yukimasu, in which the band's other single "Hana" was also used in the movie version of it. This single sold 410,924 copies and was the number 12 single of 2005.

Track listing 
  
  
 
  

Orange Range songs
2005 singles
Oricon Weekly number-one singles
Japanese television drama theme songs
2005 songs